Stigmella pruinosa is a moth of the family Nepticulidae. It is known from the Cayo District in Belize.

External links
Nepticulidae and Opostegidae of the world

Nepticulidae
Moths of Central America
Moths described in 2000